Gurjoat Siingh Khangura (born 12 July 1994) is an Indian sport shooter who competes in the skeet discipline.

Personal 
Khangura was born 12 July 1994 in New Delhi, India.

Career
At the 2021 ISSF World Cup event in Cairo, Khangura won the bronze medal in the Men's Skeet Team Event with teammates Mairaj Ahmad Khan and Angad Vir Singh Bajwa.  In New Delhi, at the ISSF Shooting World Cup 2021, Khangura won the gold medal in the Men's Skeet Team Event, once again shooting with teammates Khan and Bajwa.

References

External links
 Gurjoat Siingh Khangura at ISSF

Living people
1994 births
Indian male sport shooters
Skeet shooters
21st-century Indian people